The Revenue Act of 1935,  (Aug. 30, 1935), raised federal income tax on higher income levels, by introducing the "Wealth Tax". It was a progressive tax that took up to 75 percent of the highest incomes (over $1 million per year). The Congress separately also passed new taxes that were regressive, especially the Social Security tax.

It was signed into law by President Franklin D. Roosevelt over strong opposition from business, the rich, and conservatives from both parties.
The 1935 Act also was popularly known at the time as the "Soak the Rich" tax. To solve the problem of tax evasion through loopholes, the Revenue Act of 1937 revised tax laws and regulations to increase the efficacy of the tax.

Predicted revenue increase
Congress estimated that annual revenue would be increased by approximately $250 million when the new law took effect.

Predicted annual revenue increase (in millions)
 $45 Surtax on Rich
 $80 Estate tax on rich
 $21 Gift tax on rich
 $37 Corporation taxes
 $44 capital stock tax
 $10 excess profits tax
 $20 intercompany dividends
 –$15 Corporation charitable deductions
 $250 total tax increase

Evaluations
Liberal historian Paul Conkin concluded that the 1935 tax law in which the graduated rates were first imposed on corporations, “neither soaked the rich, penalized bigness, nor significantly helped balance the budget.” Nevertheless, angry critics complained that it was like the camel's nose under the tent, creating a precedent that would soon grow rapidly in magnitude.

See also
 Revenue Act of 1936, which included a highly controversial corporate tax on undistributed profits

References

Further reading
 Bank, Steven A. "Taxing Bigness." Tax Law Review 66 (2012): 379+. Focused largely on 1935 law; online
 Blakey, Roy G., and Gladys C. Blakey. "The Revenue Act of 1935." American Economic Review (1935): 673–690.  online
 Lutz, Harley L. "The Federal Revenue Act of 1935." American Economic Review 26.1 (1936): 161–173. online

External Resources
Text of Revenue Act of 1937 

United States federal taxation legislation
1935 in law